Magda Linette (born 12 February 1992) is a Polish professional tennis player. She has a career-high singles ranking of world No. 19 achieved in March 2023. She has reached five finals on the WTA Tour, winning two titles, the semifinal of the 2023 Australian Open, and the third round of the other three Major championships. Her most successful Grand Slam championship in terms of winning percentage is the French Open.

Linette made her first appearance in a WTA Tour tournament main draw at the Internationaux de Strasbourg in May 2013, where she also scored her first match win at this level. The same year, she reached her first WTA semifinal in Baku, coming from qualifying. Linette won her first WTA 125 title at the 2014 Ningbo International Open, and her first WTA Tour title at the 2019 Bronx Open. Her best result in WTA Premier tournaments is the quarterfinals of 2016 Pan Pacific Open.

In 2020, she won the WTA Fan Favorite Shot of the Year award for a slice forehand that she played against Peng Shuai en route to her second WTA Tour title at the Thailand Open.

Personal life
Magda Linette was born on 12 February 1992 in Poznań to Tomasz Linette and Beata Linette. Her father is a tennis coach and her mother is an educator. Linette was coached by Izudin Zunić during the first half of her career, but beginning in 2018, formed a partnership with Great Britain's Mark Gellard.

Tennis career

Youth
As a youth she represented local club Grunwald Poznań with successes at junior level.

2010

In May, Linette received a wildcard to the qualifying draw of the Warsaw Open, a Premier-level tournament. She beat her doubles partner Paula Kania in straight sets but lost to Anna Chakvetadze. In June, she won her first professional tournament in Szczecin as a wildcard entrant. In July, she made it to the final of the ITF Circuit tournament at Toruń but lost to top seed Ksenia Pervak, in straight sets.

Magda Linette won another two ITF titles in August, in Hechingen and Versmold, both in Germany. In Hechingen, as a qualifier, she defeated Sílvia Soler Espinosa of Spain, and in Versmold, she beat Irina-Camelia Begu, in straight sets.

She continued to play $25k tournaments and won her fourth title of the season in Katowice, where she defeated Eva Birnerová in three sets. The week after, she reached another final in Zagreb but lost to Renata Voráčová in three sets, after 21 consecutive wins on the ITF Women's Circuit. She reached the final in Opole, losing to Sandra Záhlavová in three sets.

2011
In early February, Linette played for the first time as a member of Poland Fed Cup team. She defeated Anne Kremer in straight sets, but lost her three other matches. In May, she made her first appearance in a Grand Slam tournament, playing in the qualifying rounds.

2012
Starting the season with several early exits, Magda Linette reached her first singles final in over 18 months at the $10k event of Florence in May but lost to Anaïs Laurendon. She reached a $25k final in Kristinehamn a month later, defeated by Sacha Jones from Australia. In Ystad, she won her first doubles title with her friend Katarzyna Piter.

She won a $10k tournament in Prague, after beating Kateřina Siniaková and Zuzana Luknárová without dropping a set, lifting her fifth singles trophy in career and the first since September 2010.

In October and November, Linette got some of her best wins of the season by beating Eleni Daniilidou in Limoges, Monica Puig in Nantes, and Karolína Plíšková in Équeurdreville. She added two more doubles titles to her prize list, including her first $50k-level trophy in Limoges with compatriot Sandra Zaniewska. In December, she ended her season by winning another tournament in doubles with Katarzyna Piter in Ankara.

2013
Back in Europe in late March, Linette reached semifinals of the indoor hardcourt tournament in Tallinn, falling to Aliaksandra Sasnovich. At the end of the month, she lost the singles final at the $25k Civitavecchia event to Anna Karolína Schmiedlová.

Getting through WTA tournament qualifying at the Baku Cup, Linette made her second appearance in a main draw at this level. She defeated Julia Cohen, runner-up of the previous edition, then Kristýna Plíšková to reach the quarterfinals where she benefited from a controversial retirement of Ons Jabeur. She lost her first semifinal match on WTA Tour to Shahar Pe'er.

Linette started to compete in successive indoor hardcourt events in France and got more success. She reached semifinals at the $50k Open de Touraine in Joué-lès-Tours. The week after, she won her eighth doubles title, partnering with Viktorija Golubic. She competed in her first $50k singles final in Nantes, falling to Aliaksandra Sasnovich. In December, she won a $25k tournament in Pune.

2014

Linette launched her grass-court season with two ITF tournaments in England but lost twice to Anett Kontaveit, in straight sets. She sustained an ankle injury from her first qualifying match at Wimbledon and had to stop playing for a month.

In September, she played a series of WTA events. At Guangzhou, she reached her first WTA Tour doubles final, partnering Alizé Cornet.

In late October, she won the WTA 125 Ningbo International Open, defeating sixth seed Wang Qiang in the final; it was the biggest title of her career.

2015: First top-100 season
Linette won a Grand Slam match for the first time when she beat compatriot Urszula Radwańska at the US Open, but then lost to Agnieszka Radwańska. She reached the Japan Women's Open final, peaking at No. 64 in the rankings.

2016–2018
Linette reached the quarterfinals at the Katowice Open and the Pan Pacific Open. At the end of the year, she was ranked No. 96.

Her 2017 season was highlighted by third tour-level semifinal of her career at Kuala Lumpur and the semifinals at the Malaysian Open. She appeared in her third career WTA Tour doubles final at Bogotá (with Cepede Royg), having been runner-up at the 2014 Guangzhou and 2016 Hong Kong events. In 2018, Linette advanced to the quarterfinals at the Taiwan Open and the Copa Colsanitas in Bogotá.

2019–2020: First WTA titles and top 35

In August, Linette won the first edition of the Bronx Open, her first WTA Tour title. The following week, Linette continued at Flushing Meadows where she lost to defending champion Naomi Osaka in the second round of the US Open. Linette cracked the top 50 for the first time in her career, after reaching the second round of the US Open.

Linette reached her third WTA Tour final at the Korea Open, losing to Karolína Muchová.

In February, Linette won the Thailand Open, rising to a career-high ranking of No. 33. In December, she was honoured by the WTA with the Fan Favorite Shot of the Year, which she performed in round two of the Thailand Open against Peng Shuai.

2021: New coach, first major doubles semifinal & two singles 3rd rounds
Linette started the season at the end of March due to a knee injury. In May, she advanced to her first semifinal since triumphing at the Hua Hin Championships last February. At Strasbourg, she defeated Yulia Putintseva in the quarterfinal before losing a three-set semifinal match against Sorana Cîrstea.

On May 21, Linette posted on Instagram that she started a new coaching partnership with Dawid Celt, who was previously coaching Agnieszka Radwańska.

At the French Open, Linette defeated Chloé Paquet, and No. 1 seed Ashleigh Barty after Barty retired with injury. In the third round, she lost to Ons Jabeur in three sets. At the same tournament in doubles, she reached the semifinals, partnering with American Bernarda Pera, for the first time in her career.

Linette continued at Wimbledon, where she defeated Amanda Anisimova and No. 3 seed Elina Svitolina to advance to the third round, where she lost to Paula Badosa in three sets.

She lost her opening match at the US Open to Coco Gauff.

2022: Second doubles title on WTA Tour
In April, Linette won two three-set matches in one day to reach the Charleston Open quarterfinals, upsetting No. 7 seed Leylah Fernandez in the second round, in 2 hours and 36 minutes, before returning to defeat Kaia Kanepi in the third round, in 2 hours and one minute. In the quarterfinal, she lost to Ekaterina Alexandrova in two sets. At the same tournament in doubles, Linette won her first doubles title, partnering with Andreja Klepač.

At the French Open, she defeated Ons Jabeur in the first round before losing to Martina Trevisan in the second round. In June, Linette and Aleksandra Krunić were crowned Eastbourne International doubles champions.

At the Chennai Open, she reached her fifth WTA Tour final, losing to Linda Fruhvirtová, in three sets.

2023: First major singles semifinal and top 20
In her first tournament of the year, Linette represented Poland at the United Cup in Brisbane, and defeated Zhibek Kulambayeva, Jil Teichmann and Lucia Bronzetti on the way to the semifinals before she lost to Madison Keys in straight sets.

At the Australian Open, Linette defeated Mayar Sherif, 16th seed Anett Kontaveit, 19th seed Ekaterina Alexandrova and fourth seed Caroline Garcia reaching the quarterfinals, her best career result at a major tournament. She went on to defeat 30th seed Karolína Plíšková to enter the semifinals where she lost to the eventual champion Aryna Sabalenka, in straight sets. As a result, she reached the top 25 at world No. 22, on 30 January 2023  and the top 20 at No. 19 on 20 March 2023.

Playing style

Linette started out as a defensive player, whose game was primarily built around her strong movement and consistent ball striking from the baseline. The Pole has, however, began finding an increasing amount of success after altering her game style away from being a counterpuncher, to actively creating opportunities to hit winners on the court. Ever since partnering with Mark Gellard, Linette also worked on improving the mental aspect of her game.

Her strengths on court are her speed, footwork, court coverage, and anticipation. Her strongest groundstroke is her two-handed backhand, which is hit flat and with depth, and which is responsible for many of the winners she accumulates on court. Her forehand is also strong, and is hit with topspin, making it a safe and reliable shot.

Having spent a significant time on the doubles circuit as well, Linette has developed solid volleying skills and often looks to finish points off at the net. She is capable of introducing drop shots and sliced backhands into points, constantly breaking up an opponent's rhythm, and to attempt to draw unforced errors out of aggressive players.

Linette's serve is not particularly strong, with her first serve averaging 95 mph (153 km/h) and her second serve averaging 80 mph (130 km/h), but is reliable, meaning that, whilst she does not ace frequently, double faults are also uncommon. She is a strong player on return, also, effectively neutralising strong first serves with a backhand down-the-line or a cross-court forehand.

Performance timelines

Only main-draw results in WTA Tour, Grand Slam tournaments, Fed Cup/Billie Jean King Cup and Olympic Games are included in win–loss records.

Singles
Current after the 2023 ATX Open.

Doubles
Current after the 2023 Australian Open.

WTA career finals

Singles: 5 (2 titles, 3 runner-ups)

Doubles: 5 (2 titles, 3 runner-ups)

WTA Challenger finals

Singles: 3 (1 title, 2 runner-ups)

ITF Circuit finals

Singles: 21 (11 titles, 10 runner–ups)

Doubles: 17 (8 titles, 9 runner–ups)

Best Grand Slam results details

Singles

Head-to-head records

Record against top 10 players
Active players are in boldface.

Top 10 wins

Notes

References

External links

 
 
 

1992 births
Living people
Sportspeople from Poznań
Polish female tennis players
Olympic tennis players of Poland
Tennis players at the 2016 Summer Olympics
Tennis players at the 2020 Summer Olympics
20th-century Polish women
21st-century Polish women